The 2011 Buffalo Bulls football team represented the University at Buffalo in the 2011 NCAA Division I FBS football season. The Bulls were led by second-year head coach Jeff Quinn played their home games at the University at Buffalo Stadium. They are a member of the East Division of the Mid-American Conference. They finished the season 3–9, 2–6 in MAC play to finish in sixth place in the East Division.

Previous season
2010 was a year of transitioning for the Bulls. Previous head coach, Turner Gill, left for Kansas and was replaced by former Cincinnati coach, Jeff Quinn. The Bulls started off well against Rhode Island with a dominating 31–0 win, but found themselves in a 3-game losing streak before winning against Bowling Green 28–26. The Bulls again found themselves in a 7-game losing streak from that point on. Despite a 2–10 overall record, Jeff Quinn managed to bring in talented recruits for the 2011 season.

Schedule

Game summaries

Pittsburgh

Recap:
The Panthers took the lead in the first quarter with a rushing touchdown by Graham. Buffalo's offense struggled to gain any yardage on the ground or in the air. Early in the second quarter, Pittsburgh missed a 32-yard field goal. One Panther drive later, and Pittsburgh missed a 47-yard field goal. Once the Bulls got the ball back, Peter Farning kicked a 40-yard field goal, putting Buffalo on the scoreboard. Both defenses remained strong throughout the first half of play. The Bulls got the ball first in the third quarter. Chazz Anderson, Buffalo's starting QB, drove for 49 yards before being intercepted by Pittsburgh's defense. Ray Graham of the Panther's later rushed for touchdown to go ahead 14–3. The next drive, Anderson lead a Buffalo drive that took them to the end zone. The score was then 14–10. Pittsburgh soon answered back with a 5-yard rushing touchdown by Ray Graham. Going into the fourth quarter, Buffalo's running back, Branden Oliver, punched in a 1-yard touchdown. The Bulls tried a 2-point conversion, but failed to make the score 21–16. Pittsburgh answered back yet again however with a quick 6 play, 60-yard drive that ended with a touchdown. On the next drive, the Bulls gained 42 yards, but failed to convert on fourth down, forcing them to turn over. On the next drive, Ray Graham broke loose for 75 yards, and later punched in a touchdown with a 1-yard gain. The end score was 35–16, Pittsburgh.

Stony Brook

Recap: After a 53-yard kick return by Buffalo's Terrell Jackson, Chazz Anderson started the game by throwing a 57-yard touchdown to Alex Dennison. Within 19 seconds, the Bulls were up by 7–0. The rest of the first quarter was scoreless for both teams. Within 2 minutes of the second quarter, Stony Brook drove for 92 yards in 10 plays, ending in a touchdown by Jordan Gush. Buffalo took the ball back the next drive, and scored a touchdown by Branden Oliver. The next drive for Buffalo also ended in a touchdown, with a 49-yard rush by Branden Oliver. The Bulls went into halftime leading Stony Brook 21–7. Within 4 minutes of the 3rd quarter, Buffalo scored another touchdown. Chazz Anderson threw a pass to Devon Hughes, who made his way to the end zone with a 15-yard run. Buffalo ended the 3rd quarter with a 43-yard rushing touchdown by Branden Oliver, making it 35–7. In the fourth quarter, Stony Brook drove for 50 yards, until Khalil Mack sacked Stony Brook's quarterback, Kyle Essington, who fumbled. Fred Branch of Buffalo recovered the ball to put away the game.

Ball State

Recap: The game started out well for the Bulls, who scored a touchdown in their first drive. However, that first touchdown was their last of the half. The Buffalo offense and defense were completely exposed as the Cardinals score 21 unanswered points in the first half. Within 7 minutes of the third drive, Buffalo scored their second touchdown with a run by Branden Oliver. The kick attempt was blocked by Ball State's defense. The score remained 21–13 going into the fourth quarter. Within 2 minutes of the fourth quarter, Buffalo scored their third touchdown, but failed on their 2-point conversion. One drive later, and the Bulls scored their fourth touchdown, giving them a lead of 25–21 with 6 minutes remaining. This is when Ball State quarterback Keith Wenning took over the game. Buffalo's defense could not stop the Ball State juggernaut, even when they had a 4th down and 7, and a 4th down and 17. The Cardinals eventually scored their last touchdown with only 29 seconds on the clock. In the last 29 seconds of the game, Buffalo gained two first downs, but it wasn't enough to get a field goal. Ball State won, 28–25.

Connecticut

Recap: As expected, both Buffalo's and Connecticut's offenses did not click early in the game. The Bulls made more first downs in the first quarter, but were not be able to complete their drives. The Bulls took the lead in the second quarter with a field goal by Peter Fardon. Connecticut answered back quickly with a field goal of their own and a touchdown later in the quarter. The Bulls and Huskies went into halftime with a score of 3–10, Huskies leading. The third quarter was again hampered by strong defensive plays on both sides of the ball. Khalil Mack and Steven Means paired together to create impressive plays and sacks behind Connecticut's line of scrimmage. Buffalo's offense however, did not click to overcome Connecticut's strong defense, which was one of the best in the FBS. Connecticut scored another touchdown score in the fourth quarter to put away the game. The Huskies won, 17–3. The overall series record between the Bulls and Huskies is 4–15 with Connecticut leading.

Tennessee

Recap: Going into the game as 30 point underdogs, Buffalo was weaker in every category than the Tennessee Volunteers. Tyler Bray threw for 342 yards against the Bulls, while Chazz Anderson of Buffalo threw for only 99 yards. Anderson though, broke for a 68-yard run to the end zone in the first quarter. However, the Volunteers never looked back, and scored 38 unanswered points. In the fourth quarter, Buffalo scored a field goal to make the score 38–10, but the Volunteers again answered with a field goal of their own.

Ohio

Recap: Buffalo came into the game as 8 point underdogs. After losing three straight games, the team knew they had to come back to their home field with a bang. Early in the first quarter, Bo Oliver rushed into the end zone from 12 yards out to give the Bulls a 7–0 lead. On the next drive for Ohio, Harden rushed 13 yards into the end zone to tie the score at seven. Oliver answered back with another rushing touchdown from 1 yard out. Halfway through the second quarter, Chazz Anderson found Alex Neutz to complete a 36-yard touchdown pass to push the Bulls advantage to 21–7. However, Ohio scored another touchdown with 5 minutes remaining in the half. Buffalo answered quickly with a field goal to make the score 24–14. One drive later, Ohio scored a field goal to make the score 24–17 at halftime. Within 3 minutes of the 3rd quarter, Ohio's Tyler Tettleton threw a 9-yard touchdown pass to tie the game at 24. A few drives later, and Ohio's LaVon Brazill burst for a 67-yard run that put the Bobcats up 31–24. Buffalo answered as Anderson completed a 90-yard touchdown pass to Ed Young that tied the score at 31 with 7:17 remaining in the third quarter. The Bobcats took the lead again with a 46-yard field goal by Matt Weller. With 5:45 remaining in the contest, Oliver rushed for his third touchdown, this time from one yard out to give Buffalo a 38–34 lead. The next drive, Weller made another field goal to inch the Bobcats closer 38–37. However, the Bulls defense however sealed the victory when Richie Smith sacked Tettleton on fourth down with less than two minutes remaining. The Bulls won, 38–37.

Temple

Recap: Buffalo came into the game as 21 point underdogs. The offense and defense had a tough time against a Temple team that was made up of mostly seniors. Buffalo fell behind 24–0 at the half. The second half was just as devastating as the first half for the Bulls. Temple ran the ball multiple times to earn scores, and won 34–0.

Northern Illinois

Recap: The Bulls started off well with good defense, holding the Huskies to only 3 points in the first quarter. However, the Huskies fought in the second quarter, scoring 14 points with rushing touchdowns. In the third quarter, the Huskies took a 31–10 lead over the Bulls. The Huskies defense shut down in the fourth quarter. The Bulls drove for over 300 yards to score 3 touchdowns. Within the last 15 seconds of the game, Buffalo score their third touchdown to make the score 31–30. Peter Fardon, the Bulls kicker, missed the point after to lose the game. This comeback would have been one of the greatest ever played by the Bulls. Senior quarterback Chazz Anderson, had an all-time record-breaking afternoon. He completed a school-record 35 passes (on 53 attempts, the fourth highest-total in school history) for a Division I-A record 404 yards, the eighth best total in school history.

Miami (OH)

Recap:

Eastern Michigan

Recap:

Akron

Recap: Brandon "Bo" Oliver rushed for 235 yards to not only lead the Bulls to their second conference win of the season, but also broke the single-game rushing yardage in UB history. Chazz Anderson threw for 19/25 with 155 yards on the day. Anderson threw 2 touchdowns, while Oliver ran for the other 2 touchdowns. Freshman, Patrick Clarke, nailed 3 field goals and 6 PAT's. At the beginning of the game, John Syty returned the first kickoff for 93 yards.

Bowling Green

Recap:

Roster

References

Buffalo
Buffalo Bulls football seasons
Buffalo Bulls football